The 2017–18 season is Chaves' fifteenth season in the top flight of Portuguese football.

Squad

Transfers

In

|}

Out

Pre-season and friendlies

Competitions

Overall record

Primeira Liga

League table

Results by round

Matches

Taça de Portugal

Third round

Fourth round

Taça da Liga

Second round

Player statistics

|-
! colspan="14" style="background:#dcdcdc; text-align:center"| Goalkeepers    

|-
! colspan="14" style="background:#dcdcdc; text-align:center"| Defenders

|-
! colspan="14" style="background:#dcdcdc; text-align:center"| Midfielders

|-
! colspan="14" style="background:#dcdcdc; text-align:center"| Forwards

|-
! colspan="15" style="background:#dcdcdc; text-align:center;"| Players transferred out during the season

References

G.D. Chaves seasons
Chaves